In algebraic geometry, a morphism  between schemes is said to be quasi-compact if Y can be covered by open affine subschemes  such that the pre-images  are quasi-compact (as topological space). If f is quasi-compact, then the pre-image of a quasi-compact open subscheme (e.g., open affine subscheme) under f is quasi-compact.

It is not enough that Y admits a covering by quasi-compact open subschemes whose pre-images are quasi-compact. To give an example,  let A be a ring that does not satisfy the ascending chain conditions on radical ideals, and put . X contains an open subset U that is not quasi-compact. Let Y be the scheme obtained by gluing two X'''s along U. X, Y are both quasi-compact. If  is the inclusion of one of the copies of X, then the pre-image of the other X, open affine in Y, is U, not quasi-compact. Hence, f is not quasi-compact.

A morphism from a quasi-compact scheme to an affine scheme is quasi-compact.

Let  be a quasi-compact morphism between schemes. Then  is closed if and only if it is stable under specialization.

The composition of quasi-compact morphisms is quasi-compact. The base change of a quasi-compact morphism is quasi-compact.

An affine scheme is quasi-compact. In fact, a scheme is quasi-compact if and only if it is a finite union of open affine subschemes. Serre’s criterion gives a necessary and sufficient condition for a quasi-compact scheme to be affine.

A quasi-compact scheme has at least one closed point.

 See also 
fpqc morphism

 References 

Hartshorne, Algebraic Geometry''.
Angelo Vistoli, "Notes on Grothendieck topologies, fibered categories and descent theory."

External links 
When is an irreducible scheme quasi-compact?

Morphisms of schemes